Ivor Malcolm Haddon Etherington FRSE (8 February 1908 -1 January 1994) was a mathematician who worked initially on general relativity, and later on genetics and introduced genetic algebras.

Life

He was born in Lewisham in London the son of Annie Margaret and her husband Bruce Etherington, both of whom were Baptist missionaries normally based in Ceylon. His father had died in Ceylon, leaving his mother and two older siblings to return to Britain alone. His mother remarried in 1913 to Edwin Duncombe de Russet, a Baptist minister, but Ivor retained his original name. In 1921 the growing family moved out of London to Thorpe Bay on  the Essex coast, where his father then founded the Thorpe Bay School for Boys. In 1922 Ivor was sent back to London to be  educated at Mill Hill School. He was later educated at the University of Oxford and continued as a postgraduate at the University of Edinburgh where he received his doctorate. He later became a professor of mathematics at the same university.

He was elected a Fellow of the Royal Society of Edinburgh in 1934. His proposers were Sir Edmund Whittaker, Herbert Westren Turnbull, Edward Thomas Copson and David Gibb. He won the Society's Keith Medal for 1955-57.

On his retirement in 1974, he moved with his wife to Easdale on the Scottish west coast, where the family had always had a holiday home.

He died on 1 January 1994.

Family

He married Elizabeth (Betty) Goulding in 1934. They had two daughters, Donia and Judy. When Betty died in 1982, Donia came to care for her father.

During World War II he and his wife aided 32 German refugees, giving many shelter in their own home.

See also
Etherington's reciprocity theorem
Wedderburn–Etherington number

References

20th-century British mathematicians
1908 births
1994 deaths
Academics of the University of Edinburgh
Fellows of the Royal Society of Edinburgh
People educated at Mill Hill School